Mimi Brănescu (born 31 March 1974) is a Romanian actor. He appeared in more than twenty films since 2004.

Biography
Born in Lehliu, Călărași County, he studied at the Caragiale National University of Theatre and Film in Bucharest (class of ), graduating in 2000.

Selected filmography

Awards
 Gopo Award for best supporting actor (2008).

References

External links 

1974 births
Living people
People from Călărași County
Romanian male film actors
Caragiale National University of Theatre and Film alumni